Gurleen Chopra, also known as Gurlen Kaur Chopraa, is an Indian actress and model. She has appeared in Hindi, Telugu, Tamil, Marathi, Kannada and Punjabi films.

Early life
Gurleen Chopra was selected as "Miss Chandigarh" in her early age. She then tried modelling as suggested by her friends, and later decided to join films. Her parents were initially against it, but later agreed after they got to know that the film was to be directed by Lawrence D'Souza. She now became a certified nutritionist having more than 25 thousand clients all over the world.

Career
Gurleen Chopra made her debut as a model in famous song by Surjit Bindrakhiya 'tedi tedi takdi tu'in 1993. Gurleen Chopra made her debut in the Hindi film, Indian Babu. Her next Hindi film was Kuch To Gadbad Hai, in which she played an orphan girl Riya. She debuted in Telugu cinema with Ayudham  and later acted in many Telugu, Kannada and Tamil films. She played a double role in Manmatha. About her performance in the film, Sify had written, "Gurlin Chopra is impressive as Lakshmi in the blind get-up", and Rediff had written that she "has done a neat job in both her roles". She signed and shot her first Tamil film Thullal in 2004, but it released only in 2007. She then started acting in Punjabi films. Her film Hashar, opposite Babbu Mann was a hit. After a long hiatus, she signed a Telugu film titled Konaseemalo Chittemma Kittayya in 2009. She acted in a 3D Telugu romantic comedy Vasthavam.

She started shooting for her Marathi debut film Shinma in May 2015.

Filmography

References

External links

 

Actresses from Chandigarh
Living people
Actresses in Telugu cinema
Actresses in Tamil cinema
Actresses in Kannada cinema
Indian film actresses
21st-century Indian actresses
Punjabi people
Actresses in Marathi cinema
Actresses in Punjabi cinema
Actresses in Hindi cinema
Year of birth missing (living people)